Lepidosperma viscidum, the sticky saw sedge,  is a grass like plant found in south eastern Australia. Usually seen in heath and woodland on sandy and rocky sites, it may grow to 60 centimetres high. This is one of the many plants first published by Robert Brown with the type known as "(M.) v.v." appearing in his Prodromus Florae Novae Hollandiae et Insulae Van Diemen in 1810. The specific epithet viscidum is derived from the Latin with a meaning of "sticky", which refers to the sticky resin from the base and margins of the leaves and stem margins. On drying, the resin turns a red colour.

References

viscidum
Flora of New South Wales
Flora of Victoria (Australia)
Flora of Queensland
Flora of South Australia
Flora of Tasmania
Poales of Australia
Taxa named by Robert Brown (botanist, born 1773)
Plants described in 1810